José María Claro Gómez (born 25 September 1970) is a Spanish rower. He competed in the men's eight event at the 1992 Summer Olympics.

References

1970 births
Living people
Spanish male rowers
Olympic rowers of Spain
Rowers at the 1992 Summer Olympics
Place of birth missing (living people)